Diamond Lil is a daily comic strip published by Creators syndicate and created by Paws, Inc. writer and artist Brett Koth about the life of Lillian Bilious, "a feisty 75-year-old widow" in the fictional town of Turkey Knuckle, Indiana. It has been running since 2010.

The character is named after a diamond anniversary (75 years), and because she is "one of the hardest substances known to man". Strips regularly feature her blunt and forthright opinions.

References

External links
Diamond Lil on GoComics

American comic strips
Gag-a-day comics
2010 comics debuts
Comics about women
Comics set in Indiana
Female characters in comics